This is a list of foreign diplomatic missions located in the San Francisco Bay Area in the United States. , the area hosts 42 consulates-general from 41 different countries (Mexico has two). 39 are located in the city of San Francisco; there is one each in Palo Alto, Burlingame, and San Jose.

Consulates general

Other missions

Honorary consulates

 (Office in Lafayette)

 (Office in Sacramento)
 (Office in South San Francisco)

 (Office in San Mateo)

 (Office in Oakland)

 (Office in Belvedere)

 (Office in San Ramon)

 (Office in San Jose)

 (Offices in Burlingame and El Macero)

 (Office in Woodside)

 (Office in San Rafael)

See also
 List of diplomatic missions in the United States

References

External links
 State Department Foreign Consular Offices in the United States
  Mayor's Office of Economic and Workforce Development

Consulates

diplomatic missions